McAlister Kemp are an Australian country music duo made up of Drew McAlister and Troy Kemp.  Their album Country Proud was nominated for a 2012 ARIA Award for Best Country Album.

Discography

Studio albums

Compilation albums

Awards and nominations

ARIA Music Awards
The ARIA Music Awards are a set of annual ceremonies presented by Australian Recording Industry Association (ARIA), which recognise excellence, innovation, and achievement across all genres of the music of Australia. They commenced in 1987. 

! 
|-
| 2012 || Country Proud || ARIA Award for Best Country Album ||  ||

Country Music Awards of Australia
The Country Music Awards of Australia (CMAA) (also known as the Golden Guitar Awards) is an annual awards night held in January during the Tamworth Country Music Festival, celebrating recording excellence in the Australian country music industry. They have been held annually since 1973.
 (wins only)
|-
| 2011
| McAlister Kemp
| New Talent of the Year
|

References

Australian country music groups
Australian musical duos
New South Wales musical groups